Zsolt István Kürtösi (born 21 March 1971 in Kiskunfélegyháza) is a Hungarian decathlete and bobsledder.

Achievements

External links

1971 births
Living people
People from Kiskunfélegyháza
Hungarian decathletes
Athletes (track and field) at the 1996 Summer Olympics
Athletes (track and field) at the 2000 Summer Olympics
Olympic athletes of Hungary
Olympic bobsledders of Hungary
Bobsledders at the 2006 Winter Olympics
Hungarian male bobsledders
Sportspeople from Bács-Kiskun County